Highways in Bulgaria are dual carriageways, grade separated with controlled-access, designed for high speeds. In 2012, legislation amendments defined two types of highways: motorways and expressways. As of October 2022, a total of 845.3 kilometers of motorways are in service.

Generally, there are no toll roads in Bulgaria, and instead a vignette is required, except for municipal roads. Two bridges − New Europe Bridge and Danube Bridge are tolled, both at Danube border crossings to Romania. However, introduction of toll system to replace the vignettes is under way as being a more fair form of payment. In April 2016 the road agency launched a tender for implementation of an electronic toll collection system for vehicles heavier than 3.5 tonnes and the contract was signed in January 2018. Since January 2019, the electronic vignette is in charge instead of the sticker. Later, a toll system for vehicles over 3,5 tons got introduced.

Network map

History

The initial plan for construction of motorways dates back to 1973, when the government of Socialist Bulgaria approved a resolution to build a motorway ring, encompassing the country and consisting of three motorways - Trakia, Hemus and Cherno More. By the democratic changes in 1990, a total of 273 km of motorways had been built in Bulgaria. By 2007, the year of accession to the EU, this had increased to approximately 420 km with predominantly state funding. The EU accession of the country in 2007, and the improved in the recent years utilization of the allocated EU funds enabled Bulgaria to speed up the expansion of its highway network. As of December 2018,  of motorways are in service, with another  being under various stages of construction.

The first fully completed motorway was Lyulin motorway, then designated A6, a short 19 km stretch connecting Sofia with Pernik and further merging with Struma motorway (A3) that continues to Greece at Kulata border crossing, opened in 2011. However, in 2018, the government decided to merge Lyulin motorway into Struma motorway as both are forming an interrupted route from Sofia to Greece.

After 40 years of construction, the first large motorway, spanning 360 km, Trakia (A1) was inaugurated on 15 July 2013, thus connecting the capital Sofia and Burgas, at the Black Sea coast. Two years later, on 29 October 2015, the last remaining section of Maritsa motorway (A4), branching off from A1 nearby Chirpan and connecting with the border of Turkey at Kapitan Andreevo checkpoint, entered in service. Sofia Northern Bypass motorway, an important thoroughfare north of Sofia, was inaugurated in 2015.

Motorways

Expressways

Construction works on the 31.5 km section from Botevgrad to Mezdra and the 12.5 km Mezdra bypass are expected to begin in 2013. Also in 2012, were tendered design works on the section between Mezdra and Vidin.

Other highway projects 
In 2012, the Bulgarian government announced talks with Qatar to build a South–North motorway/expressway as a PPP from Svilengrad, at the Turkish/Greek border, to Ruse, at the Romanian border. The route is part of the Pan-European Corridor IX. In October 2012, a tender for a feasibility study was announced.

Future openings 

  Hemus : Boaza - Dermantsi (16 km) : 2024

  Hemus : Dermantsi - Kalenik (19 km) : 2024

  Hemus : Kalenik - Pleven (17 km) : 2024

 Struma : Blagoevgrad - Simitli (13 km) : 2024

 Europe : Dragoman - Kalotina (14 km) : 2023

 Botevgrad - Lutidil (19 km) : 2023

 Lutidil - Mezdra (13 km) : 2024

 Makresh - Bela (14 km) : 2023

 Vidin - Makresh (30 km) : 2024

 Bela - Ruzintsi (11 km) : 2024

In total 166 kms of expressway and highway will be open in 2023 - 2024.

Access to highway networks of neighbouring countries

Greece

Struma motorway connects near Kulata with the Greek A25 motorway (Serres – Lagkadas – Egnatia Odos). The route is part of the Pan-European Corridor IV.

Also an intersection on the Maritsa motorway is built near Svilengrad, to connect with the future A21 motorway in Greece.

Romania

Botevgrad–Vidin, Veliko Tarnovo–Ruse and Shumen–Ruse expressways, all branching off from Hemus motorway are planned to connect with Romania. The Botevgrad-Vidin expressway is likely the first to be built. The Romanian PM Victor Ponta made a statement after the inauguration of New Europe Bridge that Romania plans to build a motorway between Craiova and Calafat.

Also, in long terms, Cherno More motorway is planned to connect with the future Romanian A4 motorway to Constanţa (interchange with A2 motorway, leading to Bucharest).

Turkey

Maritsa motorway (A4) connects near Kapitan Andreevo with the Turkish O-3 motorway, heading to Istanbul.

Serbia

A 31.5 km section of the Europe motorway from Sofia to Kalotina was tendered in 2012 and is expected to connect with the Serbian A4 motorway to Niš. The route is part of Pan-European Corridor X.

North Macedonia

Dupnitsa-Kyustendil expressway branching off from Struma motorway is planned to connect with North Macedonia.

Gallery

See also
Transport in Bulgaria
List of bridges in Bulgaria
List of controlled-access highway systems
Evolution of motorway construction in European nations
List of railway lines in Bulgaria

Notes

References

Lists of roads
Geography of Bulgaria
Motorways in Bulgaria
Roads in Bulgaria